Pitchfork (formerly Pitchfork Media) is an American online music publication (currently owned by Condé Nast) that was launched in 1995 by writer Ryan Schreiber as an independent music blog. 

Schreiber started Pitchfork while working at a record store in suburban Minneapolis, and the website earned a reputation for its extensive coverage of indie rock music. It has since expanded and covers all kinds of music, including pop. Pitchfork was sold to Condé Nast in 2015, although Schreiber, along with his partner in Pitchfork president Chris Kaskie, remained the site's editor-in-chief and president/publisher until they eventually left the company in 2019 and 2017, respectively. Initially based in Minneapolis, Pitchfork later moved to Chicago (which remained its official headquarters up until its acquisition) and then Greenpoint, Brooklyn. Its offices are currently located in One World Trade Center alongside other Condé Nast publications.

The site is best known for its daily output of music reviews but also regularly reviews reissues and box sets. Since 2016, it has published retrospective reviews of classics, and other albums that it had not previously reviewed, each Sunday. The site publishes "best-of" lists—albums, songs—and annual features and retrospectives each year. During the 1990s and 2000s the site's reviews—favorable or otherwise—were considered widely influential in making or breaking careers.

History

In 1996, Ryan Schreiber, a recent high school graduate, influenced by fanzine culture and with no previous writing experience, created the website. Initially called Turntable, the site was updated monthly with interviews and reviews. In May 1996, the site began publishing daily and was renamed Pitchfork, alluding to Tony Montana's tattoo in Scarface. Schreiber wrote the website's first review, of Pacer by The Amps.

In early 1999, Schreiber relocated Pitchfork to Chicago, Illinois. By 2004, Schreiber brought on Kaskie as his partner in Pitchfork and they moved from sporadic updates and an unpredictable schedule to an expanded offering of four full-length album reviews daily, as well as interviews, features, and columns--designed to model a magazine for the internet age. The site also added a daily music news section by year's end through the work of its expanding staff and resources. By the end of 2004, Pitchfork had also begun garnering a following for its extensive coverage of underground music and its writing style, which was often unhindered by the conventions of journalism.

Pitchfork has launched a variety of subsidiary websites. Pitchfork.tv, a website displaying interviews, music videos and feature-length films, launched in April 2008. In July 2010, Pitchfork announced Altered Zones, a blog aggregator devoted to underground and do it yourself music. On May 21, 2011, Pitchfork announced a partnership with Kill Screen, in which Pitchfork would publish some of their articles. Altered Zones was closed on November 30. On December 26, 2012, Pitchfork launched Nothing Major, a website that covered visual arts such as fine art and photography. Nothing Major closed in October 2013. On October 13, 2015, Condé Nast announced that it had acquired Pitchfork. A key aspect of its image, Pitchfork was previously entirely independent, with only two owners: Schreiber and Pitchfork president Chris Kaskie. Following the sale, Schreiber remained as editor-in-chief while Kaskie stayed on as president/publisher.

On March 13, 2016, Pitchfork was redesigned. According to an announcement post during the redesign, they said:

In July 2017, Pitchforks co-owner and president Chris Kaskie,  who also co-created the Chicago and Paris editions of its festival, stepped down. Not too long after Kaskie's departure, Pitchforks longtime executive editor Mark Richardson stepped down. He began writing for the site in 1998 and was employed full-time in 2007. On September 18, 2018, founder Ryan Schreiber stepped down as the site's top editor. He was replaced by Puja Patel as editor-in-chief on October 15, 2018. On January 8, 2019, Schreiber announced he would be exiting the company. In January 2019, Condé Nast announced it would put all its titles, including Pitchfork, behind a paywall by the end of the year, though this did not occur.

Influence

Publicity and artist popularity
Pitchforks opinions have gained increased cultural currency; some in the mainstream media view the site as a barometer of the independent music scene, and positive quotes from its reviews are increasingly used in press releases and affixed to the front of CDs. Some publications have cited Pitchfork in having played a part in "breaking" artists such as Arcade Fire, Sufjan Stevens, Clap Your Hands Say Yeah, Interpol, The Go! Team, Junior Boys, The Books, Broken Social Scene, Cold War Kids, Wolf Parade, Tapes 'n Tapes, and Titus Andronicus although the site's true impact on their popularity remains a source of frequent debate. Their influence on the formation of communities for independent artists has led to the term "The Pitchfork Effect". Spencer Kornhaber of The Atlantic described Pitchfork as "the most influential music publication to emerge in the Internet age".

Conversely, Pitchfork has also been seen as being a negative influence on some indie artists. As suggested in a Washington Post article in April 2006, Pitchforks reviews can have a significant influence on an album's popularity, especially if it had only been available to a limited audience or had been released on an independent record label. A dismissive 0.0 review of former Dismemberment Plan frontman Travis Morrison's Travistan album led to a large sales drop and a virtual college radio blacklist. On the other hand, "an endorsement from Pitchfork—which dispenses its approval one-tenth of a point at a time, up to a maximum of 10 points—is very valuable, indeed."

Examples of Pitchforks impact include:
Arcade Fire is among the bands most commonly cited to have benefited from a Pitchfork review. In a 2005 Chicago Tribune article, a Merge Records employee states, "After the Pitchfork review, [Funeral] went out of print for about a week because we got so many orders for the record."
Bon Iver was catapulted to mainstream and critical success after a 2007 Pitchfork review of the album For Emma, Forever Ago. Pitchfork was the only publication to have included the album on a 2007 end-of-the-year list, while over sixteen popular publications included the re-release on their 2008 lists. In the summer of 2011, Pitchfork noted Bon Iver's self-titled release as "Best New Music", and later chose the release as the best album of 2011. Pitchforks critical acclamation of Bon Iver is widely seen as lifting the artist to commercial mainstream success, which culminated with his Grammy Award for Best New Artist and Best Alternative Music Album. Time nominated Bon Iver as Person of the Year in 2012, noting the 2007 Pitchfork review as the "indie cred" that "led to mainstream success".
Clap Your Hands Say Yeah member Lee Sargent has discussed the impact of Pitchforks influence on their self-titled debut album, saying, "The thing about a publication like Pitchfork is that they can decide when that happens. You know what I mean? They can say, 'We're going to speed up the process and this is going to happen...now!' And it was a kick in the pants for us, because we lost control of everything."

Size and readership
On October 24, 2003, Loren Jan Wilson of Pitchformula.com reported that Pitchfork had published 5,575 reviews from 158 different authors, with an average length of just over 520 words. Together, the reviews featured a total of 2,901,650 words. By 2007, they amassed 170,000 daily readers.

Criticism
In the 2000s the website's journalism favored independent music, favoring lo-fi and often obscure indie rock and giving only cursory treatment to other genres. The website had a reputation for publishing reviews early and for being unpredictable, often strongly dependent on which reviewer was writing. In a 2006 article in Slate, Matthew Shaer accused Pitchfork of deliberately writing provocative and contrarian reviews in order to attract attention. Cynicism and elitism have been points of critique.

The website was sometimes criticized in those years for the quality of its writing. A 2006 article in City Pages noted the large discretion the site gave to its writers, arguing it was "under-edited" and that the prose was often "overly florid". Shaer singled out some examples of "verbose and unreadable writing". In response, Schreiber told City Pages that "I trust the writers to their opinions and to their own style and presentation. The most important thing to me is they know what they're talking about and are insightful."

A 2007 review of the album Kala by M.I.A. inaccurately said that Diplo had produced the tracks, when he had produced 3 out of 11 tracks and M.I.A. had produced the rest. Another Pitchfork writer described the error as "perpetuating the male-led ingenue myth". M.I.A. and later Björk argued that this was part of a wider problem of music journalists making the assumption that female singers do not write or produce their own music.

Leaked music
In August 2006, a directory on Pitchforks servers containing over 300 albums was compromised. A web surfer managed to discover and download the collection, which included The Decemberists' The Crane Wife and TV on the Radio's Return to Cookie Mountain, both of which had been leaked to peer-to-peer networks. Allegedly, one of the albums on the server, Joanna Newsom's Ys, had not been available on file-sharing networks.

Parodies
 When Pitchfork asked comedian David Cross to compile a list of his favorite albums, he instead provided them with a list of "Albums to Listen to While Reading Overwrought Pitchfork Reviews". In it, he satirically piled over-the-top praise on fictional indie rock records, mocking Pitchfork's reviewing style.
 In 2004, comedy website Something Awful created a parody of Pitchforks front page. Entitled "RichDork Media", the page makes reference to nonexistent, obscure-sounding indie-rock bands in its reviews, news headlines and advertisements. The rating system measures music on its proximity to the band Radiohead. A similar, more light-hearted parody was created by Sub Pop, a record label whose musical artists Pitchfork has reviewed (often favorably).
 On September 10, 2007, the satirical newspaper The Onion published a story in which founder Ryan Schreiber reviews music as a whole, giving it a 6.8.
 In 2010, writer David Shapiro started a Tumblr called "Pitchfork Reviews Reviews", which reviews Pitchfork reviews.
 In 2013, the IFC sketch comedy television series Portlandia satirized the publication in a sketch in which a collective of children run a website entitled "Pitchfork Kids!" and give a highly favorable review to an album by the fictional children's music band Defiance of Anthropomorphic Sea Mammals.
 In 2016, in the RiffTrax comedy commentary for the film Icebreaker, Mike Nelson quipped about the ticking of a Geiger counter, "This Geiger counter released an album of just this; Pitchfork gave it an 8.3."

The Pitchfork Review

In December 2013, Pitchfork debuted The Pitchfork Review, a quarterly print journal focused on long-form music writing and design-focused content. J. C. Gabel, its first editor, had been the publisher of The Chicagoan and founding publisher of Stop Smiling. Pitchfork planned a limited-edition quarterly publication of about 10,000 copies of each issue, perfect bound, and printed on glossy, high-quality 8-by-10¼ paper. It was expected that about two-thirds of the content would be original, with the remaining one-third reused from the Pitchfork website. The International Business Times likened the publication's literary aspirations to The New Yorker and The Paris Review. It ended after 11 issues in November 2016.

Music festivals

Intonation Music Festival

In 2005, Pitchfork curated the Intonation Music Festival, attracting approximately 15,000 attendees to Chicago's Union Park for a two-day bill featuring performances by 25 acts, including Broken Social Scene, The Decemberists, The Go! Team, and an appearance by Les Savy Fav.

Pitchfork Music Festival

On July 29 and 30, 2006, the publication premiered its own Pitchfork Music Festival in the same park. The event attracted over 18,000 attendees per day. More than 40 bands performed at the inaugural festival, including Spoon and Yo La Tengo, as well as a rare headlining set by reunited Tropicália band Os Mutantes.

The Pitchfork Music Festival was held again in 2007. It was expanded to three days (Friday, July 13 – Sunday, July 15), with the first day being a collaboration between Pitchfork and the British music festival All Tomorrow's Parties as part of the latter's "Don't Look Back" series, in which seminal artists perform their most legendary albums in their entirety. Performers that evening included Sonic Youth playing Daydream Nation, Slint playing Spiderland, and GZA/Genius playing Liquid Swords. Some of the other artists who performed over the weekend included Yoko Ono, De La Soul, Cat Power, The New Pornographers, Stephen Malkmus, Clipse, Iron & Wine, Girl Talk, of Montreal, Deerhunter, Dan Deacon, The Ponys, and The Sea and Cake. Since 2011, a European winter edition of the festival has taken place in Paris.

All Tomorrow's Parties
In 2008 Pitchfork collaborated with All Tomorrow's Parties to curate half of the bill for one of their May festival weekends. This was the first event that Pitchfork has been involved in outside of the United States.

Rating system
Pitchforks music reviews use two different rating systems:
 Individual track reviews were formerly ranked from 1 to 5 stars, but on January 15, 2007, the site introduced a new system called "Forkcast". In it, instead of assigning tracks a particular rating, reviewers simply label them one of the following categories: "New Music", "Old Music", "Video", "Advanced Music", "Rising", "WTF", "On Repeat" (the category of their most favorably regarded songs), and "Delete" (for the least favored songs). , the site had officially removed this system, opting to instead simply review tracks, while giving some a label of "Best New Track".
 Album reviews are given a rating from 0 to 10, specific to one decimal place.

On October 24, 2003, Pitchformula.com made a survey of the 5,575 reviews available on Pitchfork at that time, showing that:
 6.7 was the average rating
 2,339 reviews had been awarded a rating of 7.4 or higher
 2,362 reviews had been awarded a rating of between 5.0 and 7.3
 873 reviews had been awarded a rating of less than 5.0

British Sea Power's 2008 album Do You Like Rock Music? was initially awarded a tongue-in-cheek rating of "U.2", however the page now gives a rating of 8.2, seemingly at odds with the critical review. Their rating of Run the Jewels' remix album Meow the Jewels (2015) was a pictogram of a cat's head with hearts for eyes – highlighting the pictogram and right-clicking on it reveals that the actual score is 7.0. Their review of Pope Francis' album Wake Up! featured the rating "3:16", though using the same method of revealing Meow the Jewels actual score reveals the score to be 5.0. Rather than give a traditional review to Jet's Shine On, the site simply posted an embedded video of a monkey urinating into its own mouth and a 0.

Albums rated 10 on release
The following is a list of albums given Pitchfork's highest possible rating, on initial release. The score is rare and has only been given to twelve albums since the site was launched in 1995. As of May 2021, 127 other albums have been given a 10.0 following a reissue or the publication of a retrospective review. Pitchfork has since deleted the reviews for 12 Rods, Amon Tobin, Walt Mink, the Flaming Lips, and Bob Dylan without replacing them, meaning that only seven albums continue to be listed with a 10.0 rating that was given on initial release. In a 2021 historical roundup, Pitchfork listed 11 albums as having received a 10.0 on their initial release: all of the albums below, with the exception of the Dylan live recording.

Relaxation of the Asshole, a comedy album by the Guided by Voices singer Robert Pollard, was awarded a dual 0 and 10 on initial release. A later site redesign changed the rating to 0 only, although the explanation for the unusual rating remains in the text of the review.

Pitchfork year-end lists

Album of the Year

Track of the Year

Video of the Year

Pitchfork decade lists

Albums of the decade

Songs of the decade

See also
 The Pitchfork 500

References

External links
 

1995 establishments in the United States
Online music magazines published in the United States
Magazines published in Chicago
Condé Nast websites
Internet properties established in 1995
Music review websites